Máel Muire Othain (died 887) was an Irish poet.

Life

Máel Muire Othain held the post of Chief Ollam of Ireland.  He died in 887 A.D. His nickname ‘Othna’, referred to him being a member of the monastery of Othain at Fahan, County Donegal. He was amongst the early poets and historians who produced various parts of Lebor Gabála Érenn.
Edward O'Reilly gives a full account of Máel Muru's works in his Irish Writers, LXXXII sq.; d. anno 884.

Death

His obit is given in the Annals of Ulster as follows:– "U887.5 Mael Muru, chief poet of Ireland, died. 
1.	The choice earth has not covered, 
To Temair's multitudes there shall not come, 
Ireland of the great territories(?) shall not contain 
A man like the pure and gentle Mael Muru. 
2.	There has never tasted death fearlessly, 
Nor reached the known dead, 
The cultivator's soil has never covered 
A more wonderful keeper of tradition."

His obit is given in the Chronicon Scotorum as follows:– "Annal CS887
Kalends. Mael Muire, the learned poet of the Irish, rested."

His obit is given in the Annals of the Four Masters as follows:– "M884.12 Maelmura, the learned and truly intelligent poet, the erudite historian of the Scotic language, died. It is of him this testimony was given:
 
1.	There trod not the charming earth, 
there never flourished at affluent Teamhair, 
The great and fertile Ireland never produced 
a man like the mild fine Maelmura. 
2.	There sipped not death without sorrow, 
there mixed not a nobler face with the dead, 
The habitable earth was not closed 
over a historian more illustrious."

References

External links
 http://www.ucc.ie/celt/published/T100005A/index.html

People from County Donegal
Medieval Irish poets
9th-century Irish writers
887 deaths
9th-century Irish poets
Year of birth unknown
Irish male poets
Irish-language writers